Andrés Anarbol Montaño Mora (born 22 May 2002) is a Mexican professional footballer who plays as a midfielder for Liga MX club Mazatlán.

International career
Montaño was called up by Raúl Chabrand to participate with the under-21 team at the 2022 Maurice Revello Tournament, where Mexico finished the tournament in third place.

Career statistics

Club

References

External links

 
 

Living people
2002 births
Mexico youth international footballers
Association football midfielders
Mazatlán F.C. footballers
Liga MX players
Footballers from Baja California Sur
Mexican footballers
People from Los Cabos Municipality